Olmeca is a genus of Mesoamerican bamboo in the grass family.

Olmeca is the only known New World bamboo having large fleshy fruits. It also has rhizomes with long necks and very open clumps.

The genus is named for the Olmec peoples of southern Mexico, who thrived in southern Mexico in the first millennium BCE.

Species
 Olmeca clarkiae (Davidse & R.W.Pohl) Ruiz-Sanchez, Sosa & Mejía-Saulés - Chiapas, Honduras
 Olmeca fulgor (Soderstr.) Ruiz-Sanchez - Oaxaca
 Olmeca recta Soderstr. - Veracruz
 Olmeca reflexa Soderstr. - Veracruz, Oaxaca, Chiapas
 Olmeca zapotecorum Ruiz-Sanchez, Sosa & Mejía-Saulés - Oaxaca

References

Bambusoideae genera
Flora of Mexico
Bambusoideae
Flora of Honduras
Neotropical realm flora